Elections to Newry and Mourne District Council were held on 21 May 1997 on the same day as the other Northern Irish local government elections. The election used five district electoral areas to elect a total of 30 councillors.

Election results

Note: "Votes" are the first preference votes.

Districts summary

|- class="unsortable" align="centre"
!rowspan=2 align="left"|Ward
! % 
!Cllrs
! % 
!Cllrs
! %
!Cllrs
! %
!Cllrs
! % 
!Cllrs
!rowspan=2|TotalCllrs
|- class="unsortable" align="center"
!colspan=2 bgcolor="" | SDLP
!colspan=2 bgcolor="" | Sinn Féin
!colspan=2 bgcolor="" | UUP
!colspan=2 bgcolor="" | DUP
!colspan=2 bgcolor="white"| Others
|-
|align="left"|Crotlieve
|bgcolor="#99FF66"|51.0
|bgcolor="#99FF66"|4
|16.8
|1
|10.6
|0
|0.0
|0
|21.6
|2
|7
|-
|align="left"|Newry Town
|32.1
|2
|bgcolor="#008800"|32.4
|bgcolor="#008800"|2
|9.1
|1
|0.0
|0
|26.4
|2
|7
|-
|align="left"|Slieve Gullion
|46.3
|2
|bgcolor="#008800"|53.7
|bgcolor="#008800"|3
|0.0
|0
|0.0
|0
|0.0
|0
|5
|-
|align="left"|The Fews
|bgcolor="#99FF66"|37.1
|bgcolor="#99FF66"|2
|27.5
|2
|35.4
|2
|0.0
|0
|0.0
|0
|6
|-
|align="left"|The Mournes
|30.4
|2
|6.8
|0
|bgcolor="40BFF5"|42.0
|bgcolor="40BFF5"|2
|13.1
|1
|7.7
|0
|5
|- class="unsortable" class="sortbottom" style="background:#C9C9C9"
|align="left"| Total
|39.5
|12
|26.7
|8
|19.2
|5
|2.5
|1
|12.1
|4
|30
|-
|}

District results

Crotlieve

1993: 4 x SDLP, 2 x Independent Nationalist, 1 x UUP
1997: 4 x SDLP, 2 x Independent Nationalist, 1 x Sinn Féin
1993-1997 Change: Sinn Féin gain from UUP

Newry Town

1993: 3 x SDLP, 2 x Sinn Féin, 1 x UUP, 1 x Independent
1997: 2 x SDLP, 2 x Sinn Féin, 1 x UUP, 1 x Independent, 1 x Independent Nationalist
1993-1997 Change: Independent Nationalist gain from SDLP

Slieve Gullion

1993: 3 x SDLP, 2 x Sinn Féin
1997: 3 x Sinn Féin, 2 x SDLP
1993-1997 Change: Sinn Féin gain from SDLP

The Fews

1993: 3 x SDLP, 2 x UUP, 1 x Sinn Féin
1997: 2 x SDLP, 2 x UUP, 2 x Sinn Féin
1993-1997 Change: Sinn Féin gain from SDLP

The Mournes

1993: 2 x UUP, 2 x SDLP, 1 x DUP
1997: 2 x UUP, 2 x SDLP, 1 x DUP
1993-1997 Change: No change

References

Newry and Mourne District Council elections
Newry and Mourne